Istanbul Agop Cymbals is a cymbal producer based in Turkey. Its products are well respected for their unique sound, which is formed by the method and the alloy used, the formula of which is known only to the owners of the firm, Armenians Arman and Sarkis Tomurcuk. It is one of two companies that formed after the split of Istanbul Cymbals.

History
The art of Turkish cymbal making dates back to the 16th century, the time of the Ottoman Empire. The very first cymbals manufactured in Turkey were actually bells, created for the use in churches. Later on, as the story goes, cymbals were produced for the Ottoman military band. In the 20th century, it had become well known that Istanbul had evolved into the cymbal-making capital of the world. Generations of master cymbal smiths developed, refined, and redefined this art in their endless search for perfection. They formulated the most musical alloy and developed and tested hand-crafting methods which had been used for centuries. As the 20th century drew to its close, the traditional Turkish method for handcrafting cymbals had all but been abandoned due to the efficiencies and mass production facility provided by machines. In 1980, the first Istanbul Cymbals began to be produced by Agop Tomurcuk, who had been working in the business of hand-made cymbal manufacture since the age of nine and had worked at the only cymbal factory in Turkey becoming the chief cymbal smith until the factory's closure in 1977. Agop's friend and partner Mehmet Tamdeger established Zilciler Kollektif Sti and chose "Zilciler" as their brand name. Shortly afterwards the brand name was changed to Istanbul.

The following years saw continued development of new designs that tried to maintain traditional methods. In 1996, Agop Tomurcuk died in an accident, and as a result the company began to be pulled in two separate directions. It was determined that the company must be split between Agop's sons, Arman and Sarkis—who continued in the tradition of their father—and Mehmet, who started his own separate company.

Brands 

"Alchemy Cymbals" is a brand of hand-made cymbals belonging to Istanbul Agop; the brand has its own production line. The main difference between Istanbul Agop and Alchemy Cymbals is the finishing process. Alchemy Cymbals also has low-cost cymbals in its production line for beginners and semi-professionals.

Some of their lines have been designed in collaboration with notable professional drummers, including Mel Lewis, Cindy Blackman, and Lenny White.

Endorsers
Many prominent drummers of multiple well known bands, as well as many younger contemporary players all spanning multiple genres from rock to jazz and indie to heavy metal all endorse the brand including: 

 
 Mel Lewis of Stan Kenton and Woody Herman 
 Jimmy Chamberlin of The Smashing Pumpkins 
 Zac Farro of Paramore
 Cindy Blackman and Michael Shrieve of Santana 
 Joey Waronker of Beck 
 Jeremy Stacey of King Crimson 
 Mark Pontius of Foster the People 
 Michael Iveson of Gotye 
 Jarrod Alexander of My Chemical Romance 
 Aaron Sterling of John Mayer 
 Mike Clark of Herbie Hancock 
 James Gadson of Bill Withers and Herbie Hancock 
 Christopher Guanlao of Silversun Pickups 
 Lenny White of Return to Forever
 George Sluppick of Chris Robinson 
 Brooks Wackerman of Avenged Sevenfold 

 Jeremy Gara of Arcade Fire  
 Darren King of Mutemath 
 Morgan Agren of Frank Zappa 
 Andrew Marshall of Billie Eilish 
 Brendan Canty of Fugazi 
 Matthew McDonough of Mudvayne
 Witold Kieltyka of Decapitated 
 Moses Archuleta of Deerhunter
 Kliph Scurlock of The Flaming Lips
 Alexei Rodriguez of 3 Inches of Blood 
 James Culpepper of Flyleaf
 Joe Plummer of The Shins 
 Charlie Hall of The War on Drugs 
 Erce Arslan of Kimaera 
 Yussef Dayes of Yussef Kamaal

 Jeremiah Green of Modest Mouse 
 Dan Bailey of Father John Misty 
 Joe Russo of Furthur 
 Paulo Baldi of Cake 
 Blair Sinta of Cyndi Lauper 
 Scott Amendola of the Scott Amendola Band 
 Brian Vodinh of 10 Years
 Brian Griffin of Taylor Hicks 
 Adam Patterson of The Expendables 
 Cengiz Baysal, session great 
 Amber Baker, session great 
 Ferit Odman, jazz great 
 Idris Muhammad, jazz great 
 Franklin Kiermyer, jazz great 
 II of Sleep Token
 Ronnie Vannucci Jr. of The Killers

See also
List of cymbal manufacturers
Cymbal making

References

External links

 

Cymbal manufacturing companies
Manufacturing companies based in Istanbul
Companies established in 1980
Turkish brands
Musical instrument manufacturing companies of Turkey